Van Independent School District is a public school district based in Van, Texas (USA).

In addition to Van, the district serves the city of Edom and the unincorporated community of Ben Wheeler. The district also serves a portion of western Smith County and extends into a small part of Henderson County.

In 2009, the school district was rated "recognized" by the Texas Education Agency.

Schools
Van High School (Texas) (Grades 9-12)
Van Junior High (Grades 6-8)
Van Middle (Grades 4-6)
J.E. Rhodes Elementary North & South campuses (Grades PK-3)

References

External links
Official Website
Trombone Section Official Site

School districts in Van Zandt County, Texas
School districts in Henderson County, Texas
School districts in Smith County, Texas